Bockel, Böckel or Boeckel is a surname. Notable people with the surname include:

 Dirk Bockel (born 1976), German-born Luxembourgian triathlete;
 Hermann Böckel (1894–1984), German military officer and Iron Cross recipient;
 Jean-Marie Bockel (born 1950), French politician;
 Manfred Böckl (born 1948), German writer;
 Otto Böckel (1859–1923), German politician;
 Tony Boeckel (1892–1924), American baseball player;
 Willy Böckl (1893–1975), Austrian figure skater;
 Dr. Jens-Jürgen Böckel (1943), German top-manager.